Raw chocolate, or raw ground chocolate paste when ground, is chocolate produced from cocoa beans that does not contain any additives like sugars.

Popularity 
Raw chocolate represents a fast-growing segment of the chocolate industry. It is often made in small batches. It has been promoted as having higher concentrations of some nutrients, although few studies have been conducted to support this.

The low-heat or "cold" production process (which avoids roasting) may help to preserve the antioxidants known to be naturally present in cocoa.[2] Many marketers produce raw chocolate that is certified organic or fairly-traded.

See also

Fair trade cocoa
Dark chocolate
Organic chocolate
Health effects of chocolate
Raw foodism
Types of chocolate

References

Types of chocolate
Chocolate industry
Raw foods
Functional food